Óscar Eduardo Sánchez Guarín (born 14 May 1985 in Manizales) is a Colombian cyclist, who currently rides for UCI Continental team .

Major results

2003
 National Junior Road Championships
1st  Road race
2nd Time trial
2006
 1st Stage 1 Vuelta a Guatemala
2007
 1st  Overall Vuelta a Colombia U23
1st Stages 3 & 4
 1st Stage 4 Ronde de l'Isard
2012
 1st  Overall Vuelta a Costa Rica
1st  Points classification
1st  Mountains classification
1st Stages 5 & 7
 5th Road race, National Road Championships
2013
 1st  Overall Vuelta a Guatemala
1st Stage 5
 1st Stage 6 Vuelta a Colombia
2014
 2nd Overall Volta Ciclística Internacional do Rio Grande do Sul
1st Stage 2
2017
 10th Overall Tour of Croatia
2018
 5th Overall Tour of the Gila
1st Stage 1
2019
 1st  Mountains classification Tour de Beauce

References

External links

1985 births
Living people
Colombian male cyclists
People from Manizales